Saint-Jory-de-Chalais (literally Saint-Jory of Chalais) is a commune in the Dordogne department in Nouvelle-Aquitaine in southwestern France.

Geography
The Côle flows south through the middle of the commune; it forms part of the commune's northern and southern borders.

Population

Sights
Arboretum des Pouyouleix

See also
Communes of the Dordogne department

References

Communes of Dordogne